Yelpratti is a village in the Raybag taluka of Belgaum district in the southern Indian state of Karnataka. As of the 2011 Indian census, it had a population of 6,542.

References

Villages in Belagavi district